Nicole Mbole (born 12 December 1981) is a Congolese handball player for Mikishi Lubumbashi and the DR Congo national team.

References

1981 births
Living people
Democratic Republic of the Congo female  handball players